This is a list of auto racing tracks in Canada. The number of turns and track length are based on the standard, full courses for each track. The major series in bold listed are currently hold a race at the track.

Road courses

Temporary circuits

Paved ovals

Dirt ovals

Drag strips

References

Canada,Tracks
Canada
Auto racing
Tracks